Sala Sporturilor Mediaş  is an indoor arena in Mediaş, Romania. Its best known tenant is the men's basketball club Gaz Metan Mediaş.

References

Indoor arenas in Romania
Basketball venues in Romania
Buildings and structures in Sibiu County